Lists of holidays by various categorizations.

Religious holidays

Abrahamic holidays (Middle Eastern)

Jewish holidays 

Chag HaMatzot (Feast of Unleavened Bread – 7 days of consumption of matzo with wine and avoidance of leavened foods)
Hanukkah (Feast of Dedication; Also called the Festival of Lights – Commemoration of the rededication of the Jerusalem Temple)
Pesach (Passover – Deliverance of Jews from slavery in Egypt)
Lag BaOmer (A holiday celebrated on the 33rd day of the Counting of the Omer, which occurs on the 18th day of the Hebrew month of Iyar)
Purim (Feast of Lots – Deliverance of Jews in Persia from extermination by Haman)
Reishit Katzir (Feast of Firstfruits – Collecting and waving of grain bundles (barley or wheat); Occurs during the 7 days of unleavened bread after the Sabbath)
Rosh Hashanah (Jewish New Year – First day of Tishrei every year)
Shabbat (The 7th Day Sabbath – The day of rest and holiest day of the week, Saturday)
Shavuot (Feast of Weeks – Wheat harvesting in Israel and the receiving of the Torah at Mount Sinai)
Sukkot (Feast of Tabernacles; Also called the Feast of Ingathering – Dwelling within sukkahs for 7 days (in Israel) or 8 days (the diaspora); Considered by some to be a mini-campout)
Shemini Atzeret (A holiday sometimes confused as being the 8th day of Sukkot; Beginning of the rainy season in Israel)
Simchat Torah (Observed after Shemini Atzeret; Completion of the Sefer Torah)
Yom Kippur (Day of Atonement – A day of fasting and repentance of one's sins from the past year)

Christian holidays 

Christmas (Nativity of Jesus Christ, the beginning of Christmastide)
Solemnity of Mary, Mother of God
 Epiphany of the Lord
 Palm Sunday (Commemoration of the triumphal entry of Jesus Christ into Jerusalem)  
 Paschal Triduum, Easter Vigil (first liturgical celebration of the Resurrection of Jesus) and Easter. (The beginning of Eastertide)
 Feast of the Ascension
 Pentecost (descent of the Holy Spirit)
 Feast of Corpus Christi
 Feast of the Transfiguration
 Feast of the Assumption
 The Exaltation of the Holy Cross (Holy Rood Day) (commemorates the finding and annual elevation of the cross used in the crucifixion of Jesus Christ to the people)
 Reformation Day
 All Saints' Day
 Solemnity of Christ the King
 Totensonntag
 Feast of the Immaculate Conception

Islamic holidays 

Ashura (Day of Atonement; Tenth day of Muharram. Muharram is the first month of the lunar year)
Eid (feast): Date determined by the lunar calendar and observation of the Moon
Eid al-Adha (Feast of the Sacrifice; Tenth day of Dhu al-Hijjah, the twelfth and final month of the lunar year)
Arafah (Eve of Eid al-Adha)
Eid al-Fitr (Feast of Breaking the Fast; First day of Shawwal. It marks the end of Ramadan, the fasting month. Part of honoring this occasion is "zakaat ul-fitr" (giving alms to the needy on the day of Eid al-Fitr))
Chaand Raat (Eve of Eid al-Fitr)
Holy Month of Ramadan (First day of Ramadan; A 30-day period of fasting to commemorate the first revelation of the Quran)
Jumu'atul-Wida (Friday of Farewell; Last Friday of Ramadan before the celebration of Eid al-Fitr)
Laylat al-Qadr (Night of Decree; Last ten days of Ramadan. The revealing of the first verses of the Quran to Muhammad)
Isra and Mi'raj (Night Journey; Ascension of Muhammad into Heaven)
Jumu'ah (More commonly known as the Day of Assembly or the Day of Gathering; Held every Friday of the lunar year as an alternative to the Zuhr prayer)
Mawlid (Birth of Muhammad)
Mid-Sha'ban (Bara'a Night; Decisions of the fortunes of men in the approaching year)
Nuzul Al Quran (First revelation of the Quran)
Raʼs as-Sanah al-Hijrīyah (Islamic New Year; First day of Muharram every year)

Baháʼí holidays 

1st Day of Ridván
9th Day of Ridván
12th Day of Ridván
Ascension of `Abdu'l-Bahá
Ascension of Bahá'u'lláh
Baháʼí Naw-Rúz
Birth of Bahá'u'lláh
Birth of the Báb
Day of the Covenant
Declaration of the Báb
Martyrdom of the Báb

Mandaean holidays

Parwanaya
Dehwa Daimana
Kanshiy u-Zahly
Dehwa Rabba
Dehwa d-Šišlam Rabba 
Dehwa Hanina 
Ead Fel
Ashoriya

 Dharmic holidays (Indian) 
 Buddhist holidays 
 Asalha Puja
 Blessed Rainy Day (Bhutanese)
 Bodhi Day
 Bon Festival (Japanese)
 Buddha Jayanti or Vesak
 Kathina
 Diwali
 Magha Puja
 Pchum Ben (Cambodian)
 Poya

 Hindu holidays 

 Jain holidays 
 Diwali
 Kshamavani
 Paryushana

 Sikh holidays 
 Bandi Chhor Divas
 Gurupurab
 Guru Tegh Bahadur's Martyrdom Day
 Hola Mohalla
 Vaisakhi

 Pagan holidays 
 Ancient Greek/Roman holidays 
 Adonia/Rosalia
 Dionysia/Bacchanalia
 Floralia
 Kronia/Saturnalia
 Lemuralia
 Lykaia/Lupercalia
 Parentalia
 Vestalia
 Vinalia

 Celtic, Norse, and Neopagan holidays In the order of the Wheel of the Year: Samhain/Halloween (Celtic): 31 October–1 November, Celtic New Year, first day of winter
 Yule (Norse): 21–22 December, winter solstice, Celtic midwinter
 Imbolc/Candlemas (Celtic): 1–2 February, Celtic first day of spring
 Ostara/Easter (Norse): 21–22 March, spring equinox, Celtic midspring
 Beltane/May Day (Celtic): 30 April–1 May, Celtic first day of summer
 Litha (Norse): 21–22 June, summer solstice, Celtic midsummer
 Lughnasadh/Lammas (Celtic): 1–2 August, Celtic first day of autumn
 Mabon (Norse): 21–22 September, autumn equinox, Celtic midautumn

 Other holidays 
 East Asian holidays 

 Chinese New Year
 Chongyang Festival
 Dragon Boat Festival
 Fukagawa Festival
 First Full Moon Festival
 Ghost Festival
 Gion Festival
 Harvest Festival
 Japanese Autumn Festival
 Kanda Festival
 Mid-Autumn Festival
 Qingming Festival
 Qixi Festival
 Sanja Festival
 Sannō Festival
 Tado Festival

 Messianic interpretations of Jewish holidays for Christians 

The following table is a chart based on a Messianic Jewish perspective of the 9 biblical holidays (including the Sabbath), along with their times and days of occurrence, references in the Bible, and how they point to Yeshua (Jesus). All the holidays shown below are major with the exceptions of the Feast of Dedication and the Feast of Lots which are minor festivals.

 Western winter holidays in the Northern Hemisphere 

The following holidays are observed to some extent at the same time during the Southern Hemisphere's summer, with the exception of Winter Solstice.
Winter Solstice (the longest night and shortest day of the year) or Yule (Winter solstice, around 21–22 December in the Northern Hemisphere and 21–22 June in the Southern Hemisphere) – The solstice celebrations are traditionally marked with anything that symbolizes or encourages life. Decorating evergreens with bright objects and lights, singing songs, giving gifts, feasting and romantic events are often included. For Neopagans this is the celebration of the death and rebirth of the Sun and is one of the eight sabbats on the Wheel of the Year.
Christmas Eve (24 December) – Day before Christmas. Traditions usually include big feasts at night to celebrate the day to come. It is the night when Santa Claus delivers presents to all the good children of the world.
Christmas Day (25 December) – Christian holiday commemorating the birth of Jesus. Traditions include gift-giving, the decoration of trees and houses, and Santa Claus folktales.
Hanukkah (25 Kislev–2 Tevet – almost always in December) – Jewish holiday celebrating the defeat of Seleucid forces who had tried to prevent Israel from practicing the Jewish faith, and also celebrating the miracle of the Menorah lights burning for eight days with only enough olive oil for one day supply. In Hebrew, "Hanukkah" means "dedication" or "to dedicate".
Saint Stephen's Day or Second Day of Christmas (26 December) – Holiday observed in many European countries.
Boxing Day (26 December or 27 December) – Holiday observed in many Commonwealth countries on the first non-Sunday after Christmas.
New Year's Eve (31 December) – Night before New Year's Day. Usually observed with celebrations and festivities in anticipation of the new year.
New Year's Day (1 January) – Holiday observing the first day of the year in the Gregorian calendar.

 Secular holidays 
Many other days are marked to celebrate events or people, around the world, but are not strictly holidays as time off work is rarely given.
 International 
All Hallows' Day – (1 November in the United States, Canada, Mexico (where it is known as the Day of the Dead), and other countries). A day of remembrance and honour of all the Faithful Believers who have passed, been canonized, and gone to Heaven.
Asteroid Day – (30 June, global). Founded in 2014 (initiated after the 2013 Chelyabinsk meteor air burst) and recognized in 2016 by the United Nations to mark the June 30, 1908 Tunguska event and raise awareness about the hazards of asteroid impacts.
Halloween – (31 October, especially in the UK and former British colonies, including the United States, Canada, and Australia). Also called All Hallows' Eve, it is a highly secularized outgrowth of Christian All Hallows' Day on 1 November, and pagan Celtic Samhain (halfway point between autumn equinox and winter solstice).
International Men's Day – (19 November in Canada, Australia, India, Jamaica, Trinidad and Tobago, United Kingdom, Singapore, South Africa, and Malta)
International Women's Day – (8 March, particularly in Australia, former Soviet bloc countries and mainland China)
May Day, Labor/Labour Day, or International Workers' Day – (1 May in many European and South American countries. The United States and Canada both celebrate on the first Monday in September)
Saint Nicholas Day – (5 or 6 December in the Netherlands, Belgium, Lebanon, and other countries)
Saint Patrick's Day – (17 March in Ireland, the United States, Canada, and other countries by people of Irish descent or heritage)
Saint Valentine's Day – (14 February in the United States, Canada, and many other countries as a day to celebrate love and affection)
Thanksgiving Day – (4th Thursday in November in the United States, 2nd Monday in October in Canada). Generally observed as an expression of gratitude, traditionally to God, for the autumn harvest. It is traditionally celebrated with a meal shared among friends and family in which turkey is eaten. In Canada, since the climate is colder than in the US, the harvest season begins and ends earlier.

 Regional 

 Consecutive holidays 
 In the People's Republic of China, the Spring Festival and National Day are week-long holidays in the mainland territory known as Golden Weeks.
 In Colombia, in the holy week there are consecutive holidays Jueves Santo (Holy Thursday) and Viernes Santo (Holy Friday) with variable dates in March or April.
 In The Netherlands, Remembrance of the Dead is celebrated on 4 May from 19:00 and Liberation Day on the 5th. This way Remembrance of the Dead and Liberation Day constitute one remembrance: for both Victims and Liberation.
 In Ireland, Saint Patrick's Day can occasionally occur in Holy Week, the week before Easter; in this case the three holidays (Saint Patrick's Day, Good Friday, and Easter Monday) plus three days' leave can result in a 10-day break. See Public holidays in the Republic of Ireland.
 In Poland during holidays on 1 May and 3 May, when taking a few days of leave can result in 9-day-long holidays; this is called The Picnic (or Majówka).
 In Japan, golden-week lasts roughly a full week. Then, in 2007, the law was amended so that if any 2 public holidays occur both on a weekday and are separated by a day, then that intermediate day shall also be a public holiday, thus creating a 3-day-long public holiday.
 In Australia, New Zealand, Africa, Canada, Ireland, Poland, Russia and the UK, a public holiday otherwise falling on a Sunday will result in observance of the public holiday on the next available weekday (generally Monday). This arrangement results in a long weekend.
 The United States Congress changed the observance of Memorial Day and Washington's Birthday from fixed dates to certain Mondays in 1968 (effective 1971). Several states had passed similar laws earlier.

 Unofficial holidays, awareness days, and other observances 

These are holidays that are not traditionally marked on calendars. These holidays are celebrated by various groups and individuals. Some are designed to promote a cause, others recognize historical events not recognized officially, and others are generally intended as humorous distractions.
 420 (20 April) (Day celebrating cannabis culture)
 April Fools' Day (1 April)
 Bicycle Day (19 April)
 Black Friday or Buy Nothing Day (Day after Thanksgiving Day in the United States)
 Bloomsday (16 June based on James Joyce's 1922 novel Ulysses'')
 Festivus (23 December)
 Friendship Day (First Sunday in August)
 Galactic Tick Day (Occurs every 633.7 days, starting 2 October 1608)
 Giving Tuesday (Tuesday following Thanksgiving Day, Black Friday and Cyber Monday in the United States)
 International Talk Like a Pirate Day (19 September)
 Marathon Monday (Local name in Boston for Patriot's Day)
 Mischief Night (30 October)
 Mole Day (23 October)
 Monkey Day (14 December)
 National Cancer Survivors Day (First Sunday in June)
 National Gorilla Suit Day (31 January)
 National Hugging Day (21 January)
 No Pants Day (First Friday of May)
 Opposite Day (25 January) (Day where you do everything opposite)
 Pi Day (14 March)
 Record Store Day (Third Saturday of April)
 Singles Awareness Day (15 February)
 Star Wars Day (4 May) "May the Fourth be with you"
 Super Bowl Sunday (Day of the National Football League championship)
 Sweetest Day (Third Saturday in October)
 Tax Freedom Day
 Towel Day (25 May) (Tribute to the author Douglas Adams)
 World Backup Day (31 March)
 World Peace Day (21 September)

See also 
 List of month-long observances
 List of environmental dates
 List of food days

References 

Lists of observances
Lists of days